is an organic compound of the thiazine class of heterocycles. It is used as a stain and as an antimicrobial agent. It is classified as an azine dye, and the chromophore is a cation, the anion is often unspecified.

Applications
NMB is a staining agent used in diagnostic cytopathology and histopathology, typically for staining immature red blood cells. It is a supravital stain. It is closely related to methylene blue, an older stain in wide use.

Safety
New methylene blue is toxic. Skin contact or inhalation should be avoided.

See also
 Methylene blue

References

Biochemistry detection methods
Thiazine dyes
Vital stains
Histology